A toilet plume is the dispersal of microscopic particles as a result of flushing a toilet.  Normal use of a toilet by healthy individuals is considered unlikely to be a major health risk. However this dynamic changes if an individual is fighting an illness and currently shedding out a virulent pathogen in their urine, feces or vomitus. There is indirect evidence that specific pathogens such as norovirus or SARS coronavirus could potentially be spread by toilet aerosols, but , no direct experimental studies had clearly demonstrated or refuted actual disease transmission from toilet aerosols.  It has been hypothesized that dispersal of pathogens may be reduced by closing the toilet lid before flushing, and by using toilets with lower flush energy.

Possible effects on disease transmission 

There is indirect evidence that toilet aerosol can be a vector for diseases that involve acute gastroenteritis with the shedding of large numbers of pathogens through feces and vomit, with normal use of a toilet unlikely to be a major health risk.  For example, some epidemiological studies indicate transmission of norovirus in passenger airplanes and ships, and SARS coronavirus through a contaminated building sewage system, via contaminated toilets rather than other routes. The feces and vomit of infected people can contain high concentrations of pathogens, many of which are known to survive on surfaces for weeks or months, and toilets may continue to produce contaminated toilet plumes over multiple successive flushes.  Some other pathogens speculatively identified as being of potential concern for these reasons include gram-positive MRSA, Mycobacterium tuberculosis, and the pandemic H1N1/09 virus commonly known as "swine flu".

There is no direct experimental evidence on disease transmission by toilet aerosols.  Whether or not aerosols can contain norovirus, SARS coronavirus, or other pathogens has not been directly measured .  The combination of cleaning and disinfecting surfaces is usually effective at removing contamination, although some pathogens such as norovirus have an apparent resistance to these techniques.

Mechanism 
Aerosol droplets produced by flushing the toilet can mix with the air of the room, larger droplets will settle on a surface before they can dry, and can contaminate surfaces such as the toilet seat and handle, which can then be contacted by hands.  Smaller aerosol particles can become droplet nuclei as a result of evaporation of the water in the droplet; these have negligible settling velocity and are carried by natural air currents.  Disease transmission through droplet nuclei is not a concern for many pathogens, because they are not excreted in feces or vomit, or are susceptible to drying.  The critical size dividing these dispersal modes depends on the evaporation rate and vertical distance between the toilet and the surface in question.

Experiments to test bioaerosol production usually involve seeding a toilet with bacteria or virus particles, or fluorescent microparticles, and then testing for their presence on nearby surfaces and in the air, after varying amounts of time.  The amount of bioaerosol varies with the type of flush toilet.  Older wash-down toilet designs produce more bioaerosol than modern siphoning toilets.  Among modern toilets, bioaerosol production increases as qualitative flush energy increases, from low-flush gravity-flow toilets common in residences, to pressure-assisted toilets, to vigorous flushometer toilets often found in public restrooms.

One study found that lowering the toilet lid prevented dispersion of large droplets, and reduced the airborne bacteria concentrations by a factor of 12.  The study recommended discouraging the use of lidless toilets, and thus contradicts the US Uniform Plumbing Code specifications for public toilets.

History 
Experiments on the bioaerosol content of toilet plumes were first performed in the 1950s.  A 1975 study by Charles P. Gerba popularized the concept of disease transmission through toilet plumes.  The term "toilet plume" was in use before 1999.

References

Toilets
Hygiene